Paul Edward Aimson (3 August 1943 – 9 January 2008) was an English footballer who played as a forward in the Football League, most notably for York City, where he scored 113 goals in 249 games in all competitions during two spells with the club.

Aimson played also as a striker for Manchester City, Bury, Bradford City, Huddersfield Town, AFC Bournemouth and Colchester United between 1961 and 1974.

Career
Born in Prestbury, Aimson began his career with Manchester City, making his debut at centre-forward at the age of 18 against Blackburn Rovers. The game ended in a 4–1 defeat for City on 9 December 1961. He retrained as a striker over the course of the next year, and in the 1963–64 season scored six goals in 17 appearances in all competitions.

He signed for York City in 1964 for a £1,000 fee, scoring 26 goals in his first season, helping the club win promotion to the Third Division. However, York were relegated in last place the following season. Aimson left the club to join Bury for £10,000 in 1966, with a record of 43 goals in 77 league games.

Aimson scored 11 league goals in 31 games for Bury, and the following season moved to Bradford City for £4,000, scoring 11 goals in 23 games. He then transferred to Huddersfield Town for £20,000, where he scored 13 goals in 38 games before moving back to York City for a fee of £8,000.

In the 1970–71 season, he aided York to another promotion to the Third Division, forming a solid partnership with Phil Boyer and scoring 26 goals. In the same season, Aimson scored a vital goal to earn York an FA Cup third round replay with Southampton. He also scored York's fastest ever goal in 9.5 seconds in a match against Torquay United.

During his second stint at York, Aimson scored 55 goals in 142 league appearances. He was top scorer for the club in four of his six campaigns in both spells, scoring a total of 113 goals in 249 games. His tally included five hat-tricks, including a perfect hat-trick, scoring with his left foot, right food and head in a 4–1 victory over Hull City in 1965.

In March 1973 he signed for AFC Bournemouth for £12,000. He made only nine appearances and scored two goals for Bournemouth, before moving to Colchester United in August 1973 for a then club record of £11,000. Injury cut his career short, and Aimson retired from playing in 1974 having played just four games and scoring two goals for the U's.

Later life
After requiring a second operation on his problematic knee, Aimson was actually given his last rites as complications from the surgery arose, but he survived, retiring to become a sales rep and later a physical recreation officer for Dorset Probation Service. Aimson received a benefit match from both Colchester and Bury in 1975, with Colchester taking on Norwich City in a promotion celebration friendly for the player, and Bury facing an all-star XI containing footballing greats from the north-west of England.

Death
Aimson died at the age of 64 of a heart attack in hospital near his home in Christchurch on 9 January 2008.

References

External links

1943 births
2008 deaths
People from Prestbury, Cheshire
English footballers
Association football forwardsd
Manchester City F.C. players
York City F.C. players
Bury F.C. players
Bradford City A.F.C. players
Huddersfield Town A.F.C. players
AFC Bournemouth players
Colchester United F.C. players
English Football League players
Footballers from Cheshire